Stegastes redemptus, commonly known as the clarion major, clarion damselfish or  clarion gregory, is a damselfish of the family Pomacentridae. It is native to the tropical eastern Pacific Ocean, its range extending from the Revillagigedo Islands to the coast of Baja California.

Status
The trend in population is unknown, but the small area of occupancy makes it vulnerable to external events such as environmental changes. El Niño events may cause the shallow waters in which it lives to become too warm and deficient in nutrients for extended periods which may threaten its survival. For these reasons, the IUCN has rated it as being "Vulnerable". No special conservation measures are in place but part of its range is within the Revillagigedo Islands Marine Protected Area.

References

redemptus
Fish described in 1903
Taxa named by Robert Evans Snodgrass
Taxa named by Edmund Heller